The fifteenth season of Law & Order: Special Victims Unit made its debut with a two-hour premiere episode on September 25, 2013, at 9pm/8c - 11pm/10c (Eastern), on NBC. The season ended on May 21, 2014.

Production
Law & Order: Special Victims Unit was renewed for a fifteenth season on April 26, 2013, which consists of 24 episodes. Cast member Mariska Hargitay (Detective Olivia Benson) revealed on May 25, 2013 that her contract had been renewed for the upcoming season. Ice-T (Detective Fin Tutuola) announced on Twitter that filming on the fifteenth season commenced on July 24, 2013.

In August 2013, Leight revealed that the storyline for the fifteenth season would pick up where the finale of the previous season had ended, with some high drama in particular for Benson; "Olivia will very much be dealing with and reeling from her encounter with Lewis...her character's got incredible empathy for others and yet has had a hard time looking out for herself. This is the season where she's talked the talk to others, but she hasn't had to walk the walk until now."

Cast changes

Returning cast and characters
On July 12, 2013, it was announced that Raúl Esparza would be elevated to the main cast as ADA Rafael Barba during this season. Esparza portrayed Barba in a recurring capacity during the series' fourteenth season. On the promotion, SVU executive producer and  showrunner Warren Leight expressed, "Making [Esparza] a series regular is a small way of acknowledging his enormous contribution to our show." Barba is the first regular ADA on the series since Alexandra Cabot (Stephanie March) in the eleventh season.

On October 2, 2013, it was announced that Broadway actress Jessica Phillips would return to the series for a recurring role as ADA Pippa Cox. Phillips previously guest starred as ADA Cox in the fourteenth season's "Born Psychopath".

Departing cast and characters
On September 27, 2013, it was announced that Richard Belzer (Sergeant John Munch) would depart the main cast in the fifth episode, "Wonderland Story." The storyline showed Munch retiring from the Special Victims Unit after 15 years in order to move onto becoming a Special District Attorney Investigator, which allowed the character to make future recurring appearances on the series. Belzer, one of the series' original cast members, collectively portrayed Munch for 20 years as a regular on Homicide: Life on the Street (1993–99) and later SVU, in conjunction with guest appearances in other Law & Order universe shows.

On December 10, 2013, it was announced that Dann Florek (Captain Donald Cragen) would depart SVU in an episode airing in January 2014. The storyline was revealed in "Internal Affairs", in which he reveals to Benson (Hargitay) that like Munch, he too has his days left at SVU numbered, as he is approaching the mandatory retirement age limit. Like Belzer, Florek was one of the series' original cast members, portraying Cragen for fifteen consecutive seasons. Florek was the last link to the original series, portraying Captain Cragen in the first three seasons of Law & Order (1990–93), returning for guest appearances in later seasons, as well as appearing in Exiled: A Law & Order Movie (1998).

Cast

Main cast

 Mariska Hargitay as Senior Detective / Sergeant Olivia Benson 
 Danny Pino as Junior Detective Nick Amaro
 Kelli Giddish as Junior Detective Amanda Rollins
 Richard Belzer as Senior Detective Sergeant John Munch (episodes 1–5)
 Ice-T as Senior Detective Odafin "Fin" Tutuola
 Raúl Esparza as Assistant District Attorney Rafael Barba
 Dann Florek as Captain Donald "Don" Cragen (episodes 1–11)

Special guest stars
 BD Wong as FBI Special Agent Dr. George Huang
 Tamara Tunie as Medical Examiner Melinda Warner

Crossover stars
 Alana de la Garza as Assistant United States Attorney Connie Rubirosa (Crossing over with Law & Order)
 Sophia Bush as Chicago Police Department Detective Erin Lindsay (Crossing over with Chicago P.D.)

Recurring cast

 Dean Winters as Detective Brian Cassidy
 Bill Irwin as Dr. Peter Lindstrom
 Pablo Schreiber as William Lewis
 Donal Logue as Lieutenant Declan Murphy
 Leslie Odom Jr. as Reverend Curtis Scott
 Robert John Burke as Internal Affairs Bureau Lieutenant Ed Tucker
 Allison Fernandez as Zara Amaro
 Josh Pais as Deputy Commissioner Hank Abraham
 Elizabeth Marvel as Defense Attorney Rita Calhoun
 Jason Cerbone as Defense Attorney Terrence Quinn
 Michael Potts as Sergeant Cole Draper
 Jessica Phillips as Assistant District Attorney Pippa Cox
 Stefanie Scott as Clare Wilson
 Greg Germann as Assistant District Attorney Derek Strauss
 Laura Benanti as Maria Grazie Amaro
 Thomas Sadoski as Nate Davis
 Sarah Street as Dr. Janice Cole
 Mel Harris as Eileen Switzer
 Delaney Williams as Defense Attorney John Buchanan

 Nia Vardalos as Defense Attorney Minonna Efron
 Jeffrey Tambor  as Defense Attorney Ben Cohen
 David Pittu as Defense Attorney Linus Tate
 Jacqueline Hardy as Defense Attorney Crane
 Jayne Houdyshell as Judge Ruth Linden
 Aida Turturro as Judge Felicia Catano
 Curt Bouril as Detective Carlson
 Nikki Estridge as Detective Delano
 Skyler Day as Renee Clark
 Jenna Stern as Judge Elana Barth
 Peter Herrmann as Defense Attorney Trevor Langan
 Stephen C. Bradbury as Judge Colin McNamara
 Tabitha Holbert as Assistant District Attorney Rose Callier 
 Ami Brabson as Judge Karyn Blake 
 Sonia Manzano as Judge Gloria Pepitone 
 Michael Mastro as Judge Serani
 Lauren Noble as Carmen
 Karen Tsen Lee as Medical Examiner Susan Chung
 Caris Vujcec as Detective Louise Campesi
 Dashiell Eaves as Sergeant Kevin Donlan

Guest stars
After appearing in the fourteenth-season finale, Dean Winters (Brian Cassidy), Pablo Schreiber (William Lewis), and Lauren Ambrose (Vanessa Mayer) continued their respective portrayals in the season premiere episode, "Surrender Benson". Winters also starred in the subsequent episodes, "Imprisoned Lives", "Internal Affairs", and "Wonderland Story". Cybill Shepherd guest starred in the 'ripped from the headlines' third episode of the season, which combines the killing of Trayvon Martin case and the Paula Deen racial epithet controversy. Shepherd's character, Jolene Castille, thought she was being pursued by a rapist and turned around to discover it was a teenager. She shot him. Jeffrey Tambor reprised his role as Defense Attorney Ben Cohen in this episode, to represent Castille.

David Conrad, who had originally auditioned to play detective Nick Amaro, appeared in "Internal Affairs" as Officer West, together with Nadia Dajani as Officer Ryan Quinn, who were suspected of raping young women during their shifts.

In "Wonderland Story", Sofia Vassilieva guest starred as Sarah Walsh, a rape victim who needed the help of Detective Benson after being raped again. Vassilieva first appeared as Walsh in the thirteenth season's "True Believers". Munch's resignation in this episode welcomed back his ex-wives Gwen Munch (Carol Kane) and Billie Lou Hatfield (Ellen McElduff) and his former Homicide: Life on the Street co-worker, Baltimore Detective Meldrick Lewis (Clark Johnson).

Kirk Acevedo appeared as Eddie Garcia in "October Surprise", a childhood friend of ADA Rafael Barba (Raúl Esparza). Originally, Acevedo played District Attorney investigator Hector Salazar in the short-lived Law & Order spin-off, Law & Order: Trial by Jury. He had made an appearance on SVU in the sixth season's TBJ-SVU crossover episode "Night".

Tony Award winner Billy Porter guest starred in "Dissonant Voices" as singing coach and television personality Jackie Walker, who was accused of sexual abuse by his students. The X Factor season 2 contestant Carly Rose Sonenclar portrayed Grace Belsey in this episode. Ashanti, Clay Aiken and Taylor Hicks make cameos as judges on a reality show.

In "Military Justice", Shiri Appleby made a special appearance as Amelia Albers, a junior officer who appeared to have been raped by her group of soldiers. In the same episode, Laura Benanti returns as Maria Grazie, the ex-wife of Detective Amaro, who provides information about the case to the SVU squad. Terry Serpico appears as Lieutenant Commander Travers, the commanding officer of Albers, and Delaney Williams returns as Defense Attorney John Buchanan.

In "Rapist Anonymous", Nia Vardalos returned as Defense Attorney Minonna Efron, having previously appeared in the season 14 episode, "Criminal Hatred". In the same episode, former co-star of The Killing, Amy Seimetz and Thomas Sadoski guest starred. Mel Harris appears in "Rapist Anonymous" and "Amaro’s One-Eighty" as Eileen Switzer, the new girlfriend of Captain Cragen.

 It was announced that Pablo Schreiber would return in the tenth episode of the season, "Psycho/Therapist", as William Lewis, when facing trial for kidnapping and assault to Detective Olivia Benson. Renée Elise Goldsberry guest stars in the same episode as the lawyer Martha Brown, who defends Lewis.

In "Amaro’s One-Eighty", Cathy Moriarty returned as Captain Toni Howard. In the same episode, Elizabeth Marvel reprises her role as defense attorney Rita Calhoun and Greg Germann returns as ADA Derek Strauss. In "Jersey Breakdown", Alana de la Garza returned as her Law & Order character, Connie Rubirosa, now as a federal prosecutor heading up a joint task force on underage sex trafficking. In the same episode, Bill Sage, Chazz Palminteri, Stefanie Scott, and Dayton Callie guest star.

 Rosanna Arquette and Mark Boone Junior guest star in "Wednesday’s Child" playing a criminal couple, known for child endangerment and pornography. Josh Pais guest stars in the same episode playing Hank Abraham, who also appears in "October Surprise".

Sophia Bush guest stars as her Chicago P.D. character Detective Erin Lindsay in the first part of a planned Law & Order: Special Victims Unit/Chicago PD crossover slated to air on February 26, 2014 after the 2014 Winter Olympics. The episode is titled "Comic Perversion", Jonathan Silverman, Laura Slade Wiggins, and Elizabeth Marvel guest star, Skyler Day returns as Reneè Clark, a character who also plays in the episode "Girl Dishonored" in season 14.

In "Gridiron Soldier", Glenn Morshower and Greg Finley guest star. Thomas Sadoski returns as Nate Davis, a character who also appeared in the previous episode "Rapist Anonymous". In "Gambler's Fallacy", Donal Logue and Sherri Saum guest star as two club managers. Stefanie Scott returns as Clare Wilson. Donal Logue has a recurring role starting in this episode until the end of the season, as Lieutenant Declan Murphy.

Alec Baldwin returns to television in "Criminal Stories" playing Jimmy MacArthur, a controversial New York newspaper columnist who questions the SVU squad's motives during the investigation of a potential hate crime/rape case. The episode also marks the directorial debut of Mariska Hargitay, whose character, Sergeant Olivia Benson, goes head to head with MacArthur. Katie Couric also makes a cameo appearance, playing herself as a talk show host who quizzes MacArthur about the headline grabbing case. Summer Bishil and Questlove guest star.

In "Reasonable Doubt", Bradley Whitford, Celia Kennan-Bolger, Aida Turturro, Emma Bell, and Samantha Mathis guest star. This is the second appearance of Mathis on the show as she had first appeared in "Control", the ninth episode of the fifth season. She had also auditioned for the role of Detective Olivia Benson in 1999. Jeffrey Tambor returns as counselor Lester Cohen. Geraldo Rivera and Ann Curry make cameo appearances.

BD Wong guest stars as Dr. George Huang in the episode entitled "Thought Criminal". This marks Wong's third appearance on the show after his departure in season 12. Nia Vardalos and Laura Benanti return as counselor Minnona Efron and Marie Grazie respectively. Joshua Malina and Brian Baumgartner guest star.

Richard Belzer returns to SVU as DA Investigator John Munch in the season finale, "Spring Awakening". This is his first appearance on the series since his departure in the fifth episode of season 15. Peter Hermann who is married to Hargitay in real life, returns as counselor Trevor Langan. His last appearance in the show was in the third episode of the twelfth season. Jason Cerbone guest stars. Michael Potts makes his second appearance in the season. Jessica Phillips returns as ADA Pippa Cox in the episode, previously starring in Season 14 as well as two episodes in the fifteenth season. ADA Cox was in charge of the Baby Boy Doe case.

Episodes

Reception

References

15
2013 American television seasons
2014 American television seasons